WOCH-CD, virtual channel 41 (UHF digital channel 49), was a low-powered, Class A Charge!-affiliated television station licensed to Chicago, Illinois, United States. The station was owned by NRJ TV, LLC.

History

WOCH started broadcasting on September 27, 1989 as W04CK and later broadcast on several channels. In 2005, it moved to its final channel location on channel 41 to avoid interference with the digital signal of Milwaukee NBC affiliate WTMJ-TV (channel 4). WOCH upgraded to Class A status on December 29, 2005, thus protecting their channel position from further displacements. During its days on channel 28 (which was its location prior to moving to channel 41), it ran The Box Music Network from midnight to noon with Korean American Broadcasting Company (or KBC) programming from noon to midnight. In 2001, when Viacom took over The Box and switched it to MTV2, WOCH began running an MTV-2 feed from DirecTV during the Midnight to Noon timeslot, but gradually phased it out by 2003-2004.

On September 15, 2010, KBC-TV started its carriage on Comcast Channel 338 in the Chicago television market. This move came after years of effort by KBC to secure carriage on the Comcast system. In addition to programming from South Korea, and some locally produced programs, WOCH aired non-Korean ethnic programming on weekends (such as programming from local cable television network Bostel), in a format similar to that of FBT 26.6.

In September 2012, KM Communications filed to sell WOCH to NRJ TV (a company unrelated to European broadcaster NRJ Radio). The sale was completed on July 30, 2013.

In April 2014, the station became an affiliate of the classic movie network The Works.

On October 31, 2015, the WOCH 41.2 subchannel began airing the Comet TV network.

On April 13, 2017, the Federal Communications Commission (FCC) announced that WOCH-CD was a successful bidder in the spectrum auction; NRJ TV would be surrendering the station's license in exchange for $9,219,110. NRJ TV surrendered WOCH-CD's license to the FCC for cancellation on August 14, 2017.

Digital television

Digital channels
The station's digital signal was multiplexed:

Analog-to-digital conversion
As a low-powered analog television station, WOCH-CA was not required to broadcast a digital signal as of the 2009 digital television transition. The station had reported, however, that viewers installing coupon-eligible converter boxes were, in some cases, unable to tune into low-powered analog stations such as WOCH-CA after conversion as many models of the digital converters lack analog passthrough.

On April 27, 2010, the FCC granted WOCH-CA a construction permit to flash cut from analog channel 41 to digital channel 49. As of July 2013 WOCH-CD began broadcasting exclusively in digital.

See also
 Lily Kim:  former producer and anchor for Asian American Network (AAN) News

References

External links

OCH-CD
Television channels and stations established in 1992
Low-power television stations in the United States
Comet (TV network) affiliates
1992 establishments in Illinois
Defunct television stations in the United States
Television channels and stations disestablished in 2017
2017 disestablishments in Illinois
OCH-CD